Tosena melanoptera is a cicada species from Thailand. It was described by William Lucas Distant in 1878.

References

Endemic fauna of Thailand
Tosenini
Insects described in 1878